Denis Ahmetović (born 26 April 1995) is a Serbian professional footballer who plays as a midfielder for Radnički Beograd.

External links

 https://www.fkbskborca.rs/2017/10/21/ahmetovic-doneo-vodjstvo-babic-sacuvao/
 https://www.fkbskborca.rs/2017/10/02/racic-ahmetovic-tri-boda/

1995 births
Living people
Serbian footballers
Association football midfielders
FK BSK Borča players
Denis Ahmetovic
Saint Louis FC players
Denis Ahmetovic
Serbian expatriate footballers
Serbian expatriate sportspeople in Thailand
Expatriate footballers in Thailand